The Adventure Project (sometimes referred to as TAP) is a nonprofit organization that creates jobs in developing countries in an effort to end poverty. The organization was founded in 2010.

History 
Becky Straw and Jody Landers met in Liberia and founded TAP in 2010. Becky Straw had a degree in International Social Welfare from Columbia University and had worked for UNICEF and charity: water.

Reception 
The Adventure Project has been covered by a variety of media outlets, including Fast Company, the Huffington Post, and Upworthy. 

In 2015, co-founders Landers and Straw received the Diane von Furstenberg People’s Voice Award.

References

External links 

 Official website

Non-profit corporations
Organizations established in 2010
Poverty-related organizations
2010 establishments in Liberia